Spirostyliferina  is a genus of pelagic or planktonic sea snails, marine gastropod molluscs in the family Spirostyliferinidae.

Species
 Spirostyliferina lizardensis Bandel, 2006
 Spirostyliferina wareni (Moolenbeek, 2009)

References

 Bandel K. 2006. Families of the Cerithioidea and related superfamilies (Palaeo-Caenogastropoda; Mollusca) from the Triassic to the Recent characterized by protoconch morphology – including the description of new taxa. Paläontologie, Stratigraphie, Fazies (14), Freiberger Forschungshefte, C 511: 59-137

External links
 Moolenbeek R.G. 2009. Hoenselaaria, a new genus with the description of a new species (Gastropoda: Eulimidae) from the Indo-Pacific. Miscellanea Malacologica 3(4) : 71-75

Truncatelloidea